The Border Patrol is a 1928 American silent Western film directed by James P. Hogan, released through Pathe Exchange and starring Harry Carey. The film is preserved at Filmmuseum Amsterdam (aka EYEInstitut).

Cast
 Harry Carey as Bill Storm
 Kathleen Collins as Beverly Dix
 Phillips Smalley as Conway Dix
 Richard Tucker as Earl Hanway
 James Neill as Lefty Waterman
 James A. Marcus as Capt. Bonham (as James Marcus)

References

External links
 

1928 films
1928 Western (genre) films
American black-and-white films
Films directed by James Patrick Hogan
Pathé Exchange films
Silent American Western (genre) films
1920s American films